Kerry Pauline Weiland (born October 18, 1980 to December 24 2022) was an American ice hockey defenceman. She was named to the United States women's ice hockey team for the 2010 Winter Olympics.

Weiland played college ice hockey for the Wisconsin Badgers. She also played one season for Vaughan Flames in the Canadian Women's Hockey League (CWHL).

Career stats
At the 2007 Esso Women's Nationals, the province of Ontario had a second team participate. The team was known as Team Ontario 2 and Kerry Weiland participated on the team. In addition, Weiland was named Alternate Captain.

International

CWHL

References

External links
U.S. Olympic Team profile

1980 births
American women's ice hockey defensemen
Ice hockey people from Anchorage, Alaska
Ice hockey players at the 2010 Winter Olympics
Living people
Medalists at the 2010 Winter Olympics
Olympic silver medalists for the United States in ice hockey
People from Matanuska-Susitna Borough, Alaska
Wisconsin Badgers women's ice hockey players